Modern liberalism may refer to:

 Modern liberalism in the United States
 Moderates (Liberal Party of Australia)